Bellona/Anua Airport is an airport in Anua on Bellona Island in the Solomon Islands .

Airlines and destinations

External links
Solomon Airlines Routes
Bellona/Anua Airport

Airports in the Solomon Islands
Rennell and Bellona Islands